Satyrium membranaceum is a species of ground orchid endemic to south and western Cape Province. It is a more gracile plant than most Satyriums, and the inflorescence is less dense than those of species such as Satyrium coriifolium or Satyrium carneum. Local populations of Satyrium membranaceum vary in colour from nearly red to pure white.

References

External links 

membranaceum
Endemic orchids of South Africa